Petrova Vas ( or ;) is a settlement north of Črnomelj in the White Carniola area of southeastern Slovenia. The area is part of the traditional region of Lower Carniola and is now included in the Southeast Slovenia Statistical Region.

Church

The local church is dedicated to John the Baptist and belongs to the Parish of Črnomelj. It was first mentioned in written documents dating to 1526, but has been extensively altered over the centuries.

References

External links

Petrova Vas on Geopedia

Populated places in the Municipality of Črnomelj